Eetu Luostarinen (born 2 September 1998) is a Finnish professional ice hockey center who plays with the Florida Panthers of the National Hockey League (NHL). He was drafted in the second round, 42nd overall, by the Carolina Hurricanes in the 2017 NHL Entry Draft.

Playing career
Luostarinen began playing for KalPa after previously spending time in their junior teams, making his professional debut in the 2016–17 Liiga season. During his rookie season, on 4 January 2017, Luostarinen was signed to a three-year extension to remain with KalPa through 2020.

In the 2018–19 season, Luostarinen ranked tied for first in goals with 15 and finished second for KalPa with 36 points in 54 regular season games.

On 30 May 2019, Luostarinen left KalPa using his NHL out-clause to sign a three-year, entry-level contract with the Carolina Hurricanes.

In the 2019–20 season, Luostarinen began his first North American season with the Hurricanes AHL affiliate, the Charlotte Checkers. Showing early offensive potential with 7 points in 10 games, Luostarinen received his first recall to Carolina on 7 November 2019. He made his NHL debut with the Hurricanes that day in a 4-2 defeat to the New York Rangers at the PNC Arena. He registered his first point, an assist, in his third game during a 8-2 victory over the Ottawa Senators on 11 November 2019. After 8 games with the Hurricanes, Luostarinen was returned to continue his season with the Checkers.

On 24 February, at the NHL trade deadline, Luostarinen was traded by the Hurricanes along with Erik Haula, Lucas Wallmark and Chase Priskie to the Florida Panthers in exchange for Vincent Trocheck on 24 February 2020. He was immediately re-assigned to AHL affiliate, the Springfield Thunderbirds.

On 18 August 2020, Luostarinen agreed to return to former Liiga club KalPa on loan until the commencement of the delayed 2020–21 North American season.

Career statistics

Regular season and playoffs

International

References

External links

1998 births
Living people
Carolina Hurricanes draft picks
Carolina Hurricanes players
Charlotte Checkers (2010–) players
KalPa players
Finnish ice hockey centres
Florida Panthers players
Springfield Thunderbirds players